Częstochowa pogrom refers to an alleged anti-Semitic disturbance that occurred on August 11, 1902, in the  town of Chenstokhov, Russian Partition under Nicholas II (modern Częstochowa, Poland). According to an official Russian report by the Tsarist Governor of the Piotrków Governorate (residing at the  distance), the said pogrom started after an altercation between a Jewish shopkeeper and a Catholic woman.

Polish version of the events
However, Polish historical research does not corroborate Russian claims. No Jews have died in the disturbance. The fight at the marketplace between a Jewish man and an ethnic Pole, both suspected of illegal activities, was instigated by the soldiers of the Imperial Russian Army. Almost instantly, the conflict turned into a mass protest against the Russian occupation. Two people were killed. The riot escalated. The Tsarists Cossacks bludgeoned the president of the Jewish council Henryk Markusfeld and attacked the Jewish neighbourhood, raping young women, looting, and destroying property. It was the first such event in Częstochowa's history.

There were 12,000 Jewish people in Częstochowa at the turn of the century, about 29% of the population. Notably, the relations between Jews and Poles in the town were good. "Products of Jewish goldsmiths – wrote Father Jan Związek –  adorned not only the synagogue interiors, but also some Catholic churches." However, bloody anti-Russian disturbances began in Częstochowa already in May 1894 in which 2,200 workers participated. The relations with the occupational forces reached its lowest point in 1905 when many striking workers were killed by the Russians, many others arrested, and sent to Siberia.

Russian and Jewish version of the events
According to the Tsarist Governor stationing in Piotrków, a mob attacked the Jewish shops in Częstochowa, killing fourteen Jews and one Russian gendarme. The imperial army brought in to restore order were said to have been stoned by the mob. Soldiers then fired, and shot two Polish rioters and wounded several others according to the Russian Governor. Within days, the Tsarist report from Russia made its way to the foreign press. The incident's alleged description was repeated by New York Times on September 14, 1902.

Jewish Workers' Voice reported: 

Because of its large Jewish community and the town's importance as a place of pilgrimage for Polish Catholics, Częstochowa experienced anti-Jewish disturbances nevertheless. On May 27, 1919, five Jews were killed in revenge for the shooting of a Polish officer by a young Jew in broad daylight at the NMP Avenue. In June 1937, during the attempted robbery of a Jewish shop one Christian passerby was shot by a Bund member, resulting in dozens of Jewish establishments being destroyed by the right-wing youth, with no fatalities on either side. Throughout the interwar period, Jewish merchants dominated in textile, leather, and food industries locally. Over half of the retail establishment belonged to Jews in Częstochowa before World War II.

References 

1902 in the Russian Empire
1902 riots
History of Częstochowa
Mass murder in 1902
Anti-Jewish pogroms in the Russian Empire
Jewish Polish history
Piotrków Governorate
August 1902 events
1902 murders in the Russian Empire